William Oscar Barnard (October 25, 1852 – April 8, 1939) was a U.S. Representative from Indiana.

Biography
Born near Liberty, Indiana, Barnard moved with his parents to Dublin, Indiana, in 1854, to Fayette County in 1856, and to Henry County in 1866.
He attended the common schools, and Spiceland Academy, Spiceland, Indiana.
He taught school for five years in Henry and Wayne Counties.
He was admitted to the Indiana bar, 1876.
He served as prosecuting attorney of the eighteenth and fifty-third judicial circuits from 1887 to 1893.
He served as judge of the fifty-third judicial circuit court of Indiana from 1896 to 1902.

Barnard was elected as a Republican to the Sixty-first Congress (March 4, 1909 – March 3, 1911).
He was an unsuccessful candidate for reelection to the Sixty-second Congress in 1910.
He resumed the practice of law in New Castle, Indiana.
He died on April 8, 1939, in New Castle, Indiana.
He was interred in Southmound Cemetery, New Castle, Indiana.

References

1852 births
1939 deaths
People from Union County, Indiana
Republican Party members of the United States House of Representatives from Indiana
Indiana state court judges
People from Wayne County, Indiana
People from New Castle, Indiana